Windar or Winder is capital city  of winder Sonmiani Tehsil in Hub District Balochistan province, Pakistan. It is located at 25°23'14N 66°39'55E with an altitude of 8 metres (29 feet). Population is 29515 Majority are Baloch,Brahui ,Sindhi Majority Are Muslim 98% while In Minority are Hinduism  And Christianity

References

Union councils of Lasbela District
Populated places in Lasbela District